Johann III Romka also known as John or Jan was a thirteenth century Bishop of Wrocław. He was Bishop from 1292 to his death on 19 November 1301.

Early life 
The first mention of him is in 1267 as chaplain of the Bishop, Thomas Zaremba and in 1268 records state he was a Canon of Wrocław and had a master's degree, indicating a university education.  He was a strong supporter of the bishop Thomas Zaremba in his dispute with Henryk IV Probus and was involved in the siege by Thomas in Racibórz in 1287.

Role as Bishop 
After the death of Thomas Zaremba, John was elected Bishop of Wroclaw on 24 April 1292 and received Papal ascent. According to Jan Długosz, he was supported in the election by the Polish part of the chapter, against the German factions.

John continued the policy of Bishop Thomas, trying to maintain and broaden the influence and economic privileges of the Bishops of Wroclaw. In this his task was easier than that of Thomas due to the death of Prince Henry, despite however the intrigues of Henry’s successor Bulko I, Duke of Świdnica-jaworski.

John conducted peace negotiations between Bolesław Srogim, and Rudolf II and later (1299) supported Konrad II the Hunchback in his conflict with his brother Henry Głogowczykiem Duke of Głogów.

Bishop John collaborated with Archbishop of Gniezno Jakub Świnka, and according to Jan Długosz that took part in the coronations of Przemysł II (1295) and Wenceslaus II(1300) in Gniezno.

In the administration of the diocese, John cared for churches in the diocese, continued the reconstruction of the Cathedral of Wroclaw and oversaw the development of parish schools. He also convened at least one diocesan synod in 1296.

References 

Prince-Bishops of Breslau
13th-century Roman Catholic bishops in Poland
14th-century Roman Catholic bishops in Poland
13th-century births
1301 deaths